Tour T1 (also known as the Tour GDF Suez) is an office skyscraper in La Défense, the high-rise business district west of Paris, France.

Construction began in 2005 and the tower was completed and opened in 2008. The tower, 185 m (607 ft) tall, is the third-tallest skyscraper in La Défense after the Tour Total (190m) and Tour First (231m). Since 2010, the entirety of the building's office space has been rented by GDF Suez.

See also 

 Skyscraper
 La Défense
 List of tallest structures in Paris

References

External links
  Official site

T1
T1
Office buildings completed in 2008
21st-century architecture in France